This is a comprehensive list of 19th-century French steam-driven (or steam-assisted) frigates - both paddle-driven and screw-propelled varieties - of the period 1841 to 1860 (including wooden-hulled frigates commenced before but launched after 1860), after which the wooden-hulled frigate merged into the evolving cruiser category.

Paddle frigates
, 20 guns
 , launched 19 July 1841 at Rochefort
 , launched 20 October 1841 at Rochefort
Converted paddle packets
  (begun as Transatlantic Packetboat No.1), 14, launched 6 October 1842 at Cherbourg
  (begun as Transatlantic Packetboat No.2), 14, launched 8 August 1842 at Cherbourg
  (begun as Transatlantic Packetboat No.3), 14, launched 15 March 1843 at Brest
  (begun as Transatlantic Packetboat No.4), 16, launched 15 March 1843 at Brest
  (begun as Transatlantic Packetboat No.5), 14, launched 15 May 1843 at Brest
  (begun as Transatlantic Packetboat No.?6), 14, launched 2 December 1842 at Lorient - wrecked 11 January 1847
  (begun as Transatlantic Packetboat No.?7), 14, launched 9 September 1843 at Lorient
  (begun as Transatlantic Packetboat No.?8), 14, launched 7 December 1843 at Lorient
  (begun as Transatlantic Packetboat No.9), 14, launched 13 May 1843 at Rochefort - wrecked 26 August 1844
  (begun as Transatlantic Packetboat No.10), 14, launched 28 June 1843 at Rochefort – wrecked 27 July 1863, burnt 10 September 1863
  (begun as Transatlantic Packetboat No.11), 14, launched 21 November 1843 at Rochefort
  (begun as Transatlantic Packetboat No.12), 14, launched 15 July 1844 at Rochefort
  (begun as Transatlantic Packetboat No.13), 14, launched 7 August 1842 at Toulon
  (begun as Transatlantic Packetboat No.14), 14, launched 19 August 1843 at Toulon
 , 8, launched 1 May 1843 at Rochefort
 , 20, launched 5 March 1844 at Rochefort
 , 20, launched 10 March 1845 at Lorient
 , 20, launched 29 May 1847 at Brest
 , 20, launched 15 February 1847 at Cherbourg - wrecked 23 September 1859
 , 8, launched 19 February 1848 at Rochefort

Screw frigates
 
 , 40 guns, launched 19 July 1849 at Brest
, 56 guns
 , launched 21 August 1856 at Toulon
 , launched 2 December 1856 at Toulon
 , launched 22 January 1856 at Brest
 , launched 25 May 1857 at Brest
, 56 guns
 , launched 15 August 1856 at Cherbourg
 , launched 3 June 1856 at Lorient
 , 36, converted from sail 1857-59 at Cherbourg
 , 36, converted from sail 1857
 , 36, converted from sail 1857
 , 36, converted from sail 1857
 , 36, converted from sail 1845
 , 40, converted from sail 1857
 , 36, converted from sail 1857
Sail frigates converted to steam on the stocks while building:
 , 28, launched 24 December 1859 at Lorient
 , 34, launched 3 May 1860 at Brest
 , 34, launched 15 August 1860 at Lorient
 , 28, launched 15 August 1860 at Brest
 , 28, launched 15 October 1860 at Rochefort
 , 28, launched 28 January 1861 at Brest
 , 34, launched 8 August 1861 at Rochefort
 , 34, launched 21 August 1861 at Lorient
 , 28, launched 26 December 1861 at Toulon
 , 22, launched 1 March 1862 at Lorient
 , 28, launched 29 April 1862 at Toulon
 , 22, launched 18 June 1863 at Cherbourg
 , 25, launched 27 February 1869 at Rochefort

See also
 List of French sail frigates
 List of French modern frigates
 List of French current frigates

Sources and Bibliography

 Demerliac, Alain: La Marine de la Restauration et de Louis-Philippe 1er: Nomenclature des Navires Français de 1815 a 1848. Éditions A.N.C.R.E., Nice, 2007.
 Roche, Jean-Michel: Dictionnaire des Bâtiments de la Flotte de Guerre Française de Colbert a nos jours - Tome (Volume) I, 1781-1870. Self-publication, 2005.
Winfield, Rif and Roberts, Stephen (2015) French Warships in the Age of Sail 1786-1861: Design, Construction, Careers and Fates. Seaforth Publishing. .

 

Frigate
France